Calliodentaliidae is a family of molluscs belonging to the order Dentaliida. The family consists of only one genus: Calliodentalium Habe, 1964.

Species
 Calliodentalium balanoides (Plate, 1908)
 Calliodentalium callipeplum (Dall, 1889)
 Calliodentalium crocinum (Dall, 1907)
 Calliodentalium semitracheatum (Boissevain, 1906)

References

Molluscs